,   (born October 9, 1970), is a Japanese actress and former top star otokoyaku (an actress who plays male roles) of the Japanese Takarazuka Revue's Star Troupe.  She joined the revue in 1991 and became the top star in 2007, five years after her classmates Sumire Haruno (the former top star of Flower Troupe) and Hikaru Asami (former top star of Snow Troupe) became top stars. She resigned from the company in April 2009 and is currently pursuing an acting career outside of the Revue.

She is original from Konan, Shiga, Japan, and her nickname is Touko.

She is of Zainichi Korean descent  and the first from such background to become the top star of the company. However, she is not the first non-Japanese actress to become a Takarazuka top star: Ran Ootori, who is of Chinese descent, was top star of Star Troupe from 1975 until 1979.

Troupe history 
 Snow Troupe: 1991–2000
 Star Troupe: 2000–2009

Biography 
Aran graduated at the top of her class from the Takarazuka Music School in 1991. She was the last member of her class to become top star, and also the last to retire from the Revue when she did so in April 2009.

She was one of the promising young stars that were promoted by the company in 1999 along with Haruno and Asami. Before she was promoted to top star status, she was considered as one of top-stars-in-waiting along with former Cosmos Troupe top stars Kei Takashiro and Yūga Yamato, former top star of Moon Troupe Jun Sena, and former top star of Snow Troupe Natsuki Mizu.

The last name of her stage name, Aran is from the protagonist of a Korean legend Legend of Ariran.

Starting her career in Snow Troupe, she developed her singing and acting alongside Takarazuka legends such as Yu Todoroki, Yoka Wao and Tatsuki Kouju. With the 1996 production of Elisabeth, she became the first to perform the lead role of Der Tod in the understudy performance. Later on, she participated in two Bow Hall performances starring Wao (Grand Shanghai and Wuthering Heights), in which she had prominent roles. In 1998, she had her first Bow Hall lead performance, Icarus.

In 1999, Aran formed The Wonder Three along with Hikaru Asami and Kouki Naruse. The trio had a Bow Hall performance under the same name. Although similar trios of younger actresses could also be found at that time in Flower Troupe (Haruno, Sena and Mizu) and Moon Troupe (Ōzora, Kiriya and Yamato), they were the only trio that was considered official. This trio also held the main roles in the special performance of Arch of Triumph; this is the first, and to date, only, instance of the Revue having three casts for one show (the main cast led by Todoroki, the new actor cast led by Rea Ranka, and the special cast led by Asami).

In 2000, she was transferred to Star Troupe and became the second man for Ko Minoru, Tatsuki Kouju and Wataru Kozuki. When Kozuki had the lead in A Song for Kingdoms (a variation of the opera Aida) as her top star debut in 2003, Aran was cast as Aida, a role which brought much applause. In the same year, she also held the lead roles in performances of Singin' in the Rain and Ganryuu.

Marking the 90th anniversary for the company in 2004, Aran had special appearances in two Cosmos Troupe productions. The first was Lightning in the Daytime, where she replaced Mizu in the Tokyo performance. This was followed by the role of Count Philippe de Chandon in Phantom, where she rejoined former Snow Troupe troupemates Wao and Mari Hanafusa.

In 2006, she had a special appearance in the Snow Troupe production of Rose of Versailles. This was both the first and last performance with classmate and former troupe mate Asami since Aran's troupe transfer.

Notable roles and performance

Snow Troupe New Actor era 

 Elisabeth - Der Tod
 Natasha of the Rainbow - Sanjou Kaoru

Snow Troupe era 

 Grand Shanghai - Wong Jin-Shun (Bow Hall performance, starring Yoka Wao)
 Wuthering Heights - Edgar (Bow Hall performance, starring Yoka Wao)
 Frozen Tomorrow - Bonnie and Clyde -  Jeremy Methvin  (Bow Hall performance, starring Tatsuki Kouju and Hitomi Tsukikage)
 Icarus - Icarus  (first leading performance at Takarazuka Bow Hall)
 Arch of Triumph - Hyrne Alvarez (regular cast)/Boris Morosow (special cast)
 Gone with the Wind - Ashley Wilkes
 Hanafubuki Koifubuki - Ishikawa Goemon (second leading performance at Takarazuka Bow Hall)

Star Troupe era 

 Rose of Versailles: Oscar and Andre - Hans Axel Von Fersen
 Gone with the Wind - Ashley Wilkes
 The Prague Spring - Jan Palach
 A Song for Kingdoms - Aida
 Singin' in the Rain - Don Lockwood
 Ganryuu - Sasaki Kojiro
 Lightning in the Daytime - Edmond de Lambrouse (Special appearance, replacing Natsuki Mizu in the Tokyo run)
 Phantom - Count Philippe de Chandon (Special appearance for Cosmos Troupe)
 Ch'ang-an, Full of Swirling Flowers - An Lu-shan
 Shigure Hill Road in Nagasaki - Rasha
 The Dragon Star - Ryuusei (Last leading performance before being top star)
 Rose of Versailles: Fersen and Marie Antoinette - Andre (Takarazuka run)/Oscar François de Jarjayes (Tokyo run)
 Rose of Versailles: Oscar - Andre (Special appearance for Snow Troupe, shared with Wataru Kozuki, Sumire Haruno, Natsuki Mizu, Jun Sena and Kei Takashiro)
 Too Short a Time to Fall in Love - Anthony Randolph

Star Troupe Top Star era 

 Hays Code - Raymond Woodrow (Top Star debut)
 Sakura / Secret Hunter - Dagobert (Top Star debut at Grand Theater)
 El Halcon - Tyrian Persimmon
 Red and Black - Julien Sorel
 The Scarlet Pimpernel - Percy Blakeney
 Side Story: The Rose of the Versailles - Bernard / NeoDandyism III - Bernard Châtelet
 My Dear New Orleans / A Bientôt  - Joy Bee (last musical with Takarazuka)

After Takarazuka 

 The Musical Aida - Aida
 Wonderful Town - Ruth Sherwood
 Edith Piaf - Piaf
 Musical MITSUKO - Mitsuko Coudenhove-Kalergi
 Antony and Cleopatra (Play directed by Yukio Ninagawa) - Cleopatra
 Chess in Concert - Florence
 Sunset Blvd. - Norma Desmond
 Alice in Wonderland - Alice
 Next to Normal - Diana
 Ghosts, Henril Ibsen (Play directed by Shintaro Mori) - Mrs. Helene Alving
 Lady Day directed by Tamiya Kuriyama - Billie Holiday
 Chess the Musical - Florence
 The Scarlet Pimpernel - Marguerite
 Termite Nest, Yukio Mishima (Play directed by Kenichi Tani) - Taeko
 Little Voice - Mari Hoff
 Billy Elliot - Mrs. Wilkinson

Personal concerts 

As a member of Takarazuka:

 The Wonder Three
 Rough Time
 Late Show
 Sense

After Takarazuka:

 Uno, 2009 - Tokyo International Forum
 Aran Kei Live, Hakobune 2010 - The Galaxy Theatre
  Super Duets with Ryuichi Kawamura 2013 - TOKYU THEATRE Orb
 Dramatic Concert 2016 - Orchard Hall

A note on Rose of Versailles 

Like Mizu, Rose of Versailles has played an important part in Aran's Takarazuka career. She is one of the very few that has been in roles of Oscar, Andre and Hans Axel Von Fersen, the three prominent male roles in the production.

References 

Living people
People from Shiga Prefecture
Japanese actresses
Takarazuka Revue
1970 births
Musicians from Shiga Prefecture
Zainichi Korean people